High Sierra Music Festival is a multi-day music festival held in Quincy, California, United States, a mountainous area about 80 miles northwest of Reno, Nevada.

History
The first High Sierra Music Festival was in 1991, and was the genesis of High Sierra Music, of Berkeley, California. The festival is held each year the weekend of July 4.  The four-day festival features an eclectic mix of some of the most famous national and international names in jamband, bluegrass, roots rock, folk rock, southern rock, jazz, country rock, newgrass and blues rock. Away from the music stages, patrons can attend films and movement playshops including yoga, pilates, etc., shop for arts and crafts, or enjoy a wide variety of gourmet food and drink. The organization has also produced festivals and concerts elsewhere in California, and in Maryland, Nevada, Georgia, Massachusetts, and Missouri.

Past artists have included The Black Crowes, Bob Weir & RatDog, Michael Franti & Spearhead, Béla Fleck and the Flecktones, Bruce Hornsby, The String Cheese Incident, Nickel Creek, moe., Widespread Panic, Medeski Martin & Wood, Yonder Mountain String Band, Gov't Mule, John Butler Trio, Umphrey's McGee, My Morning Jacket, Les Claypool, Leftover Salmon, and The Slip.

See also
List of bluegrass music festivals 
List of folk festivals
List of jam band music festivals

References

Further reading

External links

Bluegrass festivals
Children's music festivals
Electronic music festivals in the United States
Folk festivals in the United States
Jam band festivals
Music festivals established in 1991
Music festivals in California
Quincy, California
Tourist attractions in Plumas County, California
1991 establishments in California